The Hargreaves Homestead Rural Historic District, about five miles south of Holyoke, Colorado, is a  farm property, a historic district that was listed on the National Register of Historic Places in 2013.

In 2013, it included seven contributing buildings, 9 contributing structures, one contributing site, and two contributing objects, as well as 4 non-contributing resources.

References

Historic districts on the National Register of Historic Places in Colorado
Phillips County, Colorado
Farms in Colorado